Suteh Kheyl (also Romanized as Sūteh Kheyl) is a village in Zarem Rud Rural District, Hezarjarib District, Neka County, Mazandaran Province, Iran. At the 2006 census, its population was 363, in 86 families.

References 

Populated places in Neka County
Neka County